William Waring Taylor (1819–1903) was a 19th-century Member of Parliament in Wellington, New Zealand.

He represented the City of Wellington electorate from the 1860 general election to 1870 when he retired.

He is the brother of Mary Taylor.

A fuller biography is shown at

References

1819 births
1903 deaths
Members of the New Zealand House of Representatives
New Zealand MPs for Wellington electorates
19th-century New Zealand politicians
Politicians from Yorkshire